Terell Ondaan (born 9 September 1993) is a professional footballer who plays as a winger for the Guyana national team. Born in the Netherlands, he represents Guyana internationally.

Club career

Early career
Born in Amsterdam, Ondaan played in the youth academies from HFC Haarlem, AFC Ajax and AZ Alkmaar. In 2011, he had to leave Ajax and he was signed by AZ. He never played a professional match for AZ.

Telstar
In the summer of 2013 he moved to SC Telstar, where he signed an amateur contract. He only played three matches in which he scored four times for Telstar, before he was signed by Willem II.

Willem II
Willem II sold winger Virgil Misidjan to PFC Ludogorets Razgrad and wanted Ondaan to replace him. Because Ondaan had an amateur contract with Telstar, Willem II was able to sign Ondaan without any transfer fee. He transferred to his new club only two months after signing for Telstar. He made his debut for Willem II on 23 August 2013 against Sparta Rotterdam (3–0 win). His in June 2016 expiring contract was not extended.

On 11 October 2018, Ondaan joined Eerste Divisie side Telstar on a deal until 2020.

U Craiova
On 14 August 2021, he moved to FC U Craiova in Romania.

International career
Ondaan represented Netherlands during the 2015 UEFA European Under-21 Championship qualification Group 3 campaign, playing against Georgia during September 2014.

In May 2019, he was named on the Guyana national football team's provisional list for the 2019 CONCACAF Gold Cup. He made his debut on 6 June 2019 in a 0–1 friendly loss to Bermuda.

Career statistics

International

Honours
'''Willem II
Eerste Divisie: 2013–14

References

External links
 

1993 births
Living people
Association football wingers
Association football forwards
Guyanese footballers
Guyana international footballers
Guyanese people of Surinamese descent
Dutch footballers
Netherlands youth international footballers
Netherlands under-21 international footballers
Dutch people of Guyanese descent
Dutch sportspeople of Surinamese descent
Footballers from Amsterdam
SC Telstar players
Willem II (football club) players
Excelsior Rotterdam players
Grenoble Foot 38 players
NEC Nijmegen players
FC U Craiova 1948 players
Eredivisie players
Eerste Divisie players
Ligue 2 players
Liga I players
2019 CONCACAF Gold Cup players
Dutch expatriate footballers
Dutch expatriate sportspeople in France
Expatriate footballers in France
Dutch expatriate sportspeople in Romania
Expatriate footballers in Romania